The Montreal Subdivision is a railroad line owned by the St. Lawrence and Adirondack Railway and Canadian National. Operations are currently by Canadian National. The line originally ran from Massena, New York, northeast to Kahnawake, Quebec, along a former New York Central Railroad line.  At its south end, the St. Lawrence Subdivision continues south; its north end was at Adirondack Junction, a junction with the Canadian Pacific Railway's Adirondack Subdivision, along which it had trackage rights north over the Saint-Laurent Railway Bridge into Montreal.

History

The piece from Huntingdon, Quebec, north to Salaberry-de-Valleyfield opened in 1892 as part of the St. Lawrence and Adirondack Railway. The line from Valleyfield to Beauharnois was originally a branch of the Grand Trunk Railway, built in the 1880s. The StL&A leased this line, and in 1897, they opened an extension from Beauharnois to Adirondack Junction. The line passed to the New York Central Railroad and Conrail through leases, mergers, and takeovers. Conrail bought the line from Massena to Huntingdon from the Canadian National Railway in 1993.

See also
List of CSX Transportation lines

References

CSX Transportation lines
Rail infrastructure in New York (state)
Rail infrastructure in Quebec
New York Central Railroad lines
Transport in Montreal
https://www.progressiverailroading.com/resources/editorial/2020/040720Massena.pdf
https://www.cn.ca/en/news/2019/08/cn-announces-strategic-acquisition-from-csx-in-the-state-of-new/